Chorus Girl may refer to:

"The Chorus Girl", an 1886 short story by Anton Chekhov
Chorusgirl, a British pop band
Chorus Girls, a 1981 musical
A member of a chorus line

See also
Chorus (disambiguation)